KXEW is a commercial radio station located in South Tucson, Arizona, broadcasting to the Tucson, Arizona, area on 1600 AM. KXEW airs a tejano music format branded as "Radio Tejano". Its studios are located north of downtown Tucson along Oracle Road, while the transmitter site is in South Tucson.

History
KXEW first signed on for broadcasting on May 10, 1963, operating local sunrise to sunset with a directional array at 1600 kHz with 1,000 watts of power.  The callsign was inspired by those of Mexico City's giant AM station XEW. The station was owned and operated by Pan American Radio Corporation; J. Carlos McCormick was its president, CEO and majority shareholder.

The totally Spanish-language format featured traditional Mexican, Latin American and Spanish recorded music, with hourly newscasts and sports and social commentary segments throughout the day.  The style of programming was an adaptation of "Color Radio" that had been borrowed from its innovator, former Tucson disc jockey, Chuck Blore.  Oscar Humberto Stevens, Sr. was the first station manager, and Lorenzo Palma Cárdenas was the first program director.  The directional antenna array was designed by and the station's studio, transmitter and phaser equipment installed  by Oscar Leon Cuellar, who later became Arizona's first registered professional engineer with a broadcasting and communication specialization.

The station was nicknamed Radio Fiesta.  During its first years of operation some of the radio personalities who served on its staff were Alfonso Gárfias, Chato López Quintana, Tony Castro Miranda, Arnulfo "Fito" Palma Cárdenas, Ernesto Portillo Villalobos, Enrique Villegas Grácia and Manuel Palma Parra.  Oscar Stevens, Carlos McCormick, Ernesto Portillo, Lorenzo Palma, Tony Castro and Enrique Villegas had formerly worked at KEVT, Tucson's first all Spanish-language station. KXEW was the first Arizona commercial radio station license granted to a corporation/person controlled and managed by an applicant of Mexican ancestry.  KXEW was sold in 1968 to a group headed by the entertainer Harry Belafonte.  It continued under the management of Ernesto Portillo.

References

External links
 Official Website

XEW
XEW
Radio stations established in 1963
1963 establishments in Arizona
IHeartMedia radio stations
Tejano music